Christopher Sandy Jencks (born October 22, 1936) is an American social scientist.

Career
Jencks is currently the Malcolm Wiener Professor of Social Policy in the Kennedy School of Government at Harvard University.  He graduated from Phillips Exeter Academy in 1954 and was president of the school's newspaper, the Exonian, as a senior.  After Exeter, he received an A.B. in English literature from Harvard in 1958, followed by a M.Ed. in Harvard Graduate School of Education.  During the year 1960-1961 he studied sociology at the London School of Economics.  He has previously held positions at Northwestern University, the University of Chicago and the University of California at Santa Barbara.

His interests are in the study of education, social stratification, social mobility, poverty and the poor. His recent research concerns changes in family structure over the past generation, the costs and benefits of economic inequality, the extent to which economic advantages are inherited and the effects of welfare reform. Prior to his university career, he was an editor at The New Republic from 1961 to 1967 and a fellow of the Institute for Policy Studies in Washington, DC from 1963 to 1967. He served as an editor of The American Prospect. He has published more than three dozen pieces in The New York Review of Books and The New Republic.

Richwine controversy
Jencks was part of the dissertation committee at Harvard's Kennedy School that in 2009 awarded Jason Richwine – a former member of The Heritage Foundation – a PhD for his thesis, "IQ and Immigration Policy". Criticized for the way it linked race to IQ levels, the thesis lost Richwine his job at the Foundation. According to an article in The Nation by journalist and historian Jon Wiener, Jencks was "for decades a leading figure among liberals who did serious research on inequality ..." and knew exactly what was "wrong with the studies purporting to link 'race' with 'IQ'." When Wiener asked if Jencks would comment on issues involving the PhD, he replied, "Nope. But thanks for asking."

Prizes, awards and honors

 American Council on Education, co-recipient, Borden Prize for Best Book on Higher Education, 1968
 American Sociological Association, co-recipient, Best Book in Sociology, 1974
 Association of American Publishers, Best Book in Sociology and Anthropology, 1994
 Harry Chapin Media Award, 1995
 Frank Knox Fellowship, 1960–61
 Guggenheim Fellowship, 1968 and 1982
 Member, Institute for Advanced Study, 1985–86
 Visiting scholar, Russell Sage Foundation, 1991–92
 Fellow, Center for Advanced Study in the Behavioral Sciences, Stanford, 1997–98 and 2001–02
 Member of the National Academy of Education.
 Fellow of the American Academy of Arts and Sciences
 Member of the National Academy of Sciences, 1997. 
 American Academy of Political and Social Science, 2002
 American Philosophical Society, 2004
 Doctor of Laws, Kalamazoo College (1969) and Columbia College (1984)

Selected bibliography
 The Academic Revolution (with David Riesman, 1968, reissued 2001)
 Inequality: A Reassessment of the Effects of Family and Schooling in America (with seven co-authors, 1972)
 Who Gets Ahead? (with eleven co-authors, 1979)
 The Urban Underclass (with Paul Peterson, 1991)
 Rethinking Social Policy (1992)
 The Homeless (1994)
 The Black-White Test Score Gap (with Meredith Phillips, 1998)

References

Sources
Curriculum vitae of Jencks
Citation for Jencks on website of American Academy of Political and Social Science
Official homepage at Harvard University
Citation for Jencks on website of  the National Academy of Sciences
Home page, Stanford Center for Poverty and Inequality
Membership list, National Academy of Arts and Sciences

Members of the United States National Academy of Sciences
American social scientists
Harvard University faculty
Harvard Graduate School of Education alumni
1936 births
Living people
Members of the American Philosophical Society